The Multi One Design 70 (MOD 70) is a  multihull one-design yacht class, named after the Multi One Design company, created in 2009. The MOD 70 is a class of trimaran boats.

References

External links

One-design sailing classes
Multihulls